This is a complete list of compositions by Maurice Ravel, initially categorized by genre, and sorted within each genre chronologically in order of date the composition was completed. The "M." header is clickable and doing so will sort the entire list by order of composition completion date. (Clicking that header again will reverse the order; to return to the genre category order, reload the webpage.)

Catalogue "M" numbers were assigned by the musicologist Marcel Marnat according to date of composition. Arrangements by Ravel of his own works were assigned the "M" number of the original followed by a letter (a, b, c, etc.). Arrangements by Ravel of other composers' works or of "traditional" music were assigned a separate "MA" number, in order of date of arrangement.

List of compositions

References

External links
The Marnat catalogue of the works of Maurice Ravel (in French)

 
Ravel, Maurice